Jonathan Toto (born 30 March 1990) is a French former professional footballer who played as a forward.

An Metz youth product, Toto began his senior career in Cameroon with Canon Yaoundé before moving to Italy to sign for Legnano. He moved to Scotland signing as an amateur for Greenock Morton before being quickly released. He moved to Singapore with Étoile in 2011 and then to under-23 side Courts Young Lions.

Career

Youth level
Toto started his professional career in the youth teams at Metz. He holds French nationality.

Scotland
Heart of Midlothian manager Jim Jefferies brought Toto to Edinburgh on trial in August 2010 and was trying to finalise the deal with the FIGC over his registration> after his last club Legnano were wound up. During his trial he appeared as a second-half substitute in a friendly against Premier League side Blackburn Rovers.

He spent the last part of 2010 on an amateur contract with Greenock Morton, in the hope of moving permanently to Hearts in January 2011. Allan Moore stated that he was unlikely to be kept on due to failing to find form, saying that:  As a result, Toto was released by Morton towards the end of 2010, and returned to the land of his birth.

Singapore
In March 2011, Toto signed for Étoile in the S.League in Singapore. After scoring 12 goals in 24 league games for Étoile, the club gave up their place in the S.League to concentrate on grass roots football. Toto signed for Courts Young Lions in January 2012. Young Lions had finished four places below Étoile the previous season.

Greece
In the first 2013 transfer window, Toto transferred to Greek side Doxa Drama in the second tier. Toto was released by Dramas at the end of the season having failed to score in 15 matches.

See also
2010–11 Greenock Morton F.C. season

References

External links

1990 births
Living people
Sportspeople from Colombes
French sportspeople of Cameroonian descent
French footballers
Cameroonian footballers
Footballers from Hauts-de-Seine
Association football forwards
Scottish Football League players
Singapore Premier League players
FC Metz players
Canon Yaoundé players
A.C. Legnano players
Greenock Morton F.C. players
Young Lions FC players
Étoile FC players
Doxa Drama F.C. players
French expatriate footballers
French expatriate sportspeople in Italy
Expatriate footballers in Italy
French expatriate sportspeople in Scotland
Expatriate footballers in Scotland
French expatriate sportspeople in Singapore
Expatriate footballers in Singapore
French expatriate sportspeople in Greece
Expatriate footballers in Greece